Pungluang Sor Singyu (born September 8, 1988) is a Thai professional boxer in the bantamweight division and he is a former two-time World Boxing Organization (WBO) Bantamweight World Champion.

Professional career 
He originally won the title on October 20, 2012 in Manila, Philippines against AJ Banal but he failed to defend it against Namibia's Bantamweight Champion Paulus 'The Rock' Ambunda on the 2nd of March 2013, in his first title defense.

On 12 July 2014, he fought and lost to Tomoki Kameda via technical knockout in round 7 for WBO Bantamweight World Champion at MGM Grand Las Vegas.

He later regained the title by beating Ryo Akaho.

Sor Singyu has been a world champion for the two times on August 7, 2015 with a win against Ryo Akaho Japanese boxer by KO in second round at Ratchaburi Province.

He defended the title one time before losing it to Marlon Tapales on July 27, 2016 via KO in round 11 at Ayutthaya Province, and was injured from a broken jaw since round 9. Both fighters traded knockdowns, but Tapales was the one who had the final say in the 11th round, sending Singyu to the canvas, who was not even close to beating the count.

On 6 September 2020, Sor Singyu fought compatriot Campee Phayom for the WBA Asia super featherweight title. Phayom was boxing well, until the seventh round, when the experienced Singyu knocked him out cold with a powerful punch combination to finish the bout.

See also
List of bantamweight boxing champions

References

External links

Pungluang Sor Singyu - Profile, News Archive & Current Rankings at Box.Live

1988 births
Living people
Bantamweight boxers
World bantamweight boxing champions
World Boxing Organization champions
Pungluang Sor Singyu
Pungluang Sor Singyu